Serageldin is a surname. Notable people with the surname include:

Amer Serageldin (born 1971), Egyptian handball player
Ismail Serageldin (born 1944), Egyptian academic
Kareem Serageldin (born 1973), American banker